Sun on the Stubble is a novel by Colin Thiele, published in 1961. It tells the story of a German immigrant family living in rural South Australia during the 1930s. Colin Thiele was a South Australian educator and school principal.

Television series
It was adapted in 1996 as a TV miniseries entitled "Sun on the Stubble" in Australia, directed by Robert Marchand, and known as "The Valley Between"  overseas.

Cast
Christian Kohlund - Marcus Gunther
Jamie Croft - Bruno Gunther
Sophie Heathcote - Lottie Gunther
Susan Lyons - Ellie Gunther
Mignon Kent - Anna Gunther
Caroline Winnall - Emma Gunther
Ann Burbrook - Miss Knightley

See also

 South Australian Film Corporation

References

External links

Novels set in South Australia
Australian children's novels
1990s Australian television miniseries
Television shows set in South Australia
1996 Australian television series debuts
Australian drama television series
Australian Broadcasting Corporation original programming
1961 children's books
1961 Australian novels
1996 Australian television series endings